The 62nd Tony Awards ceremony was held on June 15, 2008.  The Antoinette Perry Awards for Excellence in Theatre, more commonly known as the Tony Awards, recognize achievement in live American theatre.  CBS television broadcast the event from Radio City Music Hall in New York City as it has since the 51st Awards ceremony in 1997. The event recognized Broadway productions playing during the 2007 – 2008 season and was hosted by Whoopi Goldberg.

The cut-off date for eligibility in the 2007–08 season was May 7, 2008.  The Tony Awards Administration Committee announced eligibility rules for many of the award categories. Two new categories debuted at this ceremony: Best Sound Design of a Musical and Best Sound Design of a Play.

The Tony Award nominations were announced on May 13, 2008 by David Hyde Pierce and Sara Ramirez.  In the Heights, which premiered Off-Broadway, garnered the most nominations of any show with 13.  Rodgers & Hammerstein's South Pacific received 11, the second most of any revival to date (one of these was in the new "sound design" category).  The Pulitzer Prize-winning drama August: Osage County earned seven nominations.  The revival of Sunday in the Park with George received nine nominations, the revival of Gypsy received seven, as did the new musical Passing Strange.

The "Visa Signature Tonys Preview Concert" was taped at Jazz at Lincoln Center on May 11, 2008 and broadcast on CBS television affiliates in June.  The concert featured performances from 10 Tony-eligible musicals as well as interviews with Tony nominees. This television show received a nomination for a New York Emmy Award in the Best Special Event Coverage category; the Awards were presented on March 29, 2009.

Awards ceremony

Presenters
The initial list of presenters was announced on June 2, 2008. Additional presenters were announced on June 5.

 
Alec Baldwin
Gabriel Byrne
Julie Chen
Kristin Chenoweth
Glenn Close
Harry Connick, Jr.
Laurence Fishburne
Whoopi Goldberg
Richard Griffiths
Laura Linney
John Lithgow
Liza Minnelli
Mary-Louise Parker
Mandy Patinkin
David Hyde Pierce
Daniel Radcliffe
Brooke Shields
Marisa Tomei
Lily Tomlin
John Waters
Adam Duritz

Performances
The cast of The Lion King opened the show with a performance "Circle of Life", celebrating the show's 10th anniversary.  The cast of Grease, featuring Max Crumm and Laura Osnes as Danny and Sandy, then performed "Grease" and "We Go Together".

Patti LuPone performed "Everything's Coming Up Roses" with Boyd Gaines and Laura Benanti from Gypsy.  This was followed by the cast of South Pacific in a medley of "There Is Nothin' Like A Dame", "Some Enchanted Evening", and "(I'm in Love with) a Wonderful Guy".  Daniel Evans and Jenna Russell sang "Move On" from Sunday in the Park with George.

The cast of Cry-Baby next performed "A Little Upset".  Stew and the cast of Passing Strange, including Daniel Breaker and De'Adre Aziza, performed "Keys (Marianna)"/"Keys (It's Alright)".  Lin-Manuel Miranda and the cast of In the Heights followed this with "In the Heights"/"96,000", after which the cast of Xanadu performed "Don't Walk Away".

The three new musicals that were not nominated for Best Musical also gave abbreviated performances of a song from each show.  Sierra Boggess performed "Part of Your World" from The Little Mermaid.  Faith Prince performed "Vision" from A Catered Affair, as Leslie Kritzer and Matt Cavenaugh danced in the background, and Megan Mullally and Shuler Hensley performed "Deep Love" from Young Frankenstein.

The cast of Rent performed part of "La Vie Boheme", introduced by original cast member Anthony Rapp.  Rapp then invited the rest of the original cast on stage, and they performed part of "Seasons of Love".  All of the original cast members were there except for Kristen Lee Kelly and Jesse L. Martin.

Winners and nominees
(winners are in bold)

Special Tony Awards
Regional Theatre Tony Award
Chicago Shakespeare Theater

Special Tony Award
Robert Russell Bennett, for achievements in orchestration

Lifetime Achievement in the Theatre
Stephen Sondheim

Multiple nominations and awards

These productions had multiple nominations:

13 nominations: In the Heights 
11 nominations: South Pacific  
9 nominations: Sunday in the Park with George 
7 nominations: August: Osage County, Gypsy & Passing Strange  
6 nominations: Boeing-Boeing, Macbeth & The 39 Steps 
5 nominations: Les Liaisons Dangereuses 
4 nominations: Cry-Baby, Rock 'n' Roll, The Seafarer & Xanadu
3 nominations: A Catered Affair, The Homecoming & Young Frankenstein
2 nominations: The Little Mermaid 

The following productions received multiple awards.

7 wins: South Pacific 
5 wins: August: Osage County
4 wins: In the Heights
3 wins: Gypsy
2 wins: Boeing-Boeing & The 39 Steps

See also
 Drama Desk Awards
 2008 Laurence Olivier Awards – equivalent awards for West End theatre productions
 Obie Award
 New York Drama Critics' Circle
 Theatre World Award
 Lucille Lortel Awards

References

External links
The official website of the Tony Awards
concert article
Hip Hop vs. Roller Disco Which will the 2008 Tony voters pick?

Tony Awards ceremonies
2008 theatre awards
2008 awards in the United States
2008 in New York City
2000s in Manhattan
Television shows directed by Glenn Weiss